Lagaffe nous gâte, written and drawn by Franquin, is the eighth album of the original Gaston Lagaffe series.  The 59 strips of this album were previously published in Spirou magazine.

Story
Prunelle definitively replaced Fantasio. He begins to swear some "Grdidji" and the famous "Rogntudju". Several running gags feature new Gaston's inventions. Bubulle, Gaston 's fish, appears for the first time.

Inventions
bomb against termites: bomb to be placed in each  cupboard
giant insecticide: very handful spray, but much too powerful
cuckoo clock: cuckoo taking the form of a spaceship
alarm clock: device which explodes when turned on
giant fly: made of papier-mâché, wood and cardboard, the fly is too realistic and frightening
personal atmosphere: invented perfume for Gaston's personal office which attracts horses
special transformer: a transformer to allow Christmas strings to flash on and off, but too much powerful, so that it has effects on neighbouring houses
experiment to extract energy from mouvements: when one tries to open the doors in the offices, it turns out to be very difficult
a portable version of the Gaffophone, played in the woods for M'oiselle Jeanne, resulting to a catastrophic fall of the leaves from the nearby trees

Background

References

 Gaston Lagaffe classic series on the official website
 Publication in Spirou on bdoubliées.com.

External links
Official website 

1970 graphic novels
Comics by André Franquin